Fruitland Township is a civil township of Muskegon County in the U.S. state of Michigan. The population was 5,235 at the 2000 census.

Geography

Demographics
As of the census of 2000, there were 5,235 people, 1,859 households, and 1,492 families residing in the township. The racial makeup of the township was 96.96% White, 0.63% African American, 0.65% Native American, 0.25% Asian, 0.25% from other races, and 1.26% from two or more races. Hispanic or Latino of any race were 1.03% of the population.

There were 1,859 households, out of which 39.2% had children under the age of 18 living with them, 70.6% were married couples living together, 6.9% had a female householder with no husband present, and 19.7% were non-families. 16.5% of all households were made up of individuals, and 6.3% had someone living alone who was 65 years of age or older.  The average household size was 2.81 and the average family size was 3.15.

In the township the population was spread out, with 29.0% under the age of 18, 6.2% from 18 to 24, 27.8% from 25 to 44, 27.4% from 45 to 64, and 9.7% who were 65 years of age or older.  The median age was 38 years. For every 100 females, there were 99.5 males.  For every 100 females age 18 and over, there were 98.1 males.

The median income for a household in the township was $53,977, and the median income for a family was $60,021. Males had a median income of $40,647 versus $28,615 for females. The per capita income for the township was $23,216.  About 2.0% of families and 3.3% of the population were below the poverty line, including 4.1% of those under age 18 and 7.4% of those age 65 or over.

References

External links
Fruitland Township

Townships in Muskegon County, Michigan
Townships in Michigan